Taras Demeter Ferley (October 14, 1882—July 27, 1947) was a publisher and politician in Manitoba, Canada.  He served in the Legislative Assembly of Manitoba from 1915 to 1920 as a supporter of the Liberal Party, and is notable as the first Ukrainian Canadian to be elected to Manitoba's legislature.

Ferley was born in Austro-Hungarian controlled Ukraine, and educated at the Kolomyja Gymnasium and Lemberg University.  In the Ukraine, he was a member of the Radical Party.  He moved to San Francisco, California in 1903, and took part in a communal living experiment which ended in failure after a few months.  He arrived Canada in 1905 and worked as a publisher and real estate broker.  He became the director of the Ukrainian Publishing Company of Canada, and also taught at the Ruthenian Training School at Brandon for a period beginning in 1907 till 1910.

He first ran for the Manitoba legislature in the 1914 provincial election, contesting the constituency of Gimli as an Independent-Liberal.  He lost, finishing third against Conservative Sveinn Thorvaldson and official Liberal candidate Einar Jonasson.

Ferley ran again as an Independent-Liberal in the 1915 provincial election, and became the constituency's de facto Liberal candidate after Jonasson withdrew from the race.  Ferley defeated Thorvaldson by 610 votes, and supported Tobias Norris's Liberal administration for the next five years.  In his parliamentary biography, Ferley emphasized his loyalty to Canada and to the British Empire.

As the sole Ukrainian member of the legislature, Ferley protested against the federal government's treatment of Ukrainian-Canadians during World War I.  Unlike others in the Liberal Party, he also defended Manitoba's bilingual education system of state funding for Anglophone and Francophone schools.

He was defeated in the 1920 provincial election, losing to Farmer candidate Gudmundur Fjelsted by 117 votes.

References

Bibliography

1882 births
1947 deaths
People from Ivano-Frankivsk Oblast
People from the Kingdom of Galicia and Lodomeria
Ukrainian Austro-Hungarians
Austro-Hungarian emigrants to Canada
Manitoba Liberal Party MLAs